Marina Pacifica is a marina-adjacent shopping mall featuring movie theaters, shopping, dining & copious parking. It is in southeastern Long Beach, California between Second Street and the Los Cerritos Channel. The shopping center has variously been named Marina Pacifica Mall and Marina Pacifica Shopping Center.

Original construction of the shopping center in 1972-3 was a $10 million project of the Robert Tebbe and Southern California Financial corporations on 143 acres of land, an old oil tank farm and several capped oil wells, providing  of gross leasable area for retail, a cinema and offices, oriented to the adjacent marina. The concept was one of a "Mediterranean spa", and peach, oleander and other trees were planted. There was a bridge to an adjacent residential complex.

Long Beach-based Buffums department store moved in as an anchor in 1976, building a two-story,  store designed by Associated Architects and Planners of Los Angeles, and moving its Marina branch from a smaller adjacent  location. At the time, the new Buffum's formed part of a 108-store, six-restaurant center.

A 21,000-square-foot AMC Theatres multicinema was  added in 1984.

By 1990, the Los Angeles Times characterized Marina Pacifica as an example of "the wrong way to build a mall", a "graveyard", with the staircases too hard to find, lack of a way between shops without traversing the parking lot, vacant storefronts, and a lack of attention. At the time, it was envisioned that Triple Five Joshi Development Co., partner of the Triple Five conglomerate that built the West Edmonton Mall, the world's largest at the time, would buy the Marina Pacifica Mall.

Buffum's closed all its branches including Marina Pacifica in 1990. In May 2020 it was announced Pier 1 would close all locations, including the Marinia Pacifica location. It was closed by August 2020. 

Tower Records closed in 2007 and was replaced by Best Buy in 2008, which closed in October 2018.

Current tenants include Nordstrom Rack, AMC Theatres, Barnes & Noble, Sit 'n Sleep, and a Ralphs supermarket.

The property is currently being redeveloped and managed by NewMark Merrill Companies.

References

External links

NewMark Merrill Corporate Website

Shopping malls in the South Bay, Los Angeles
Buildings and structures in Long Beach, California
1973 establishments in California
Mixed-use developments in California
Neighborhoods in Long Beach, California